Julius Samuel Held (1905–2002) was an art historian, collector, and expert on Dutch painters Peter Paul Rubens, Anthony van Dyck, and Rembrandt. He published several monographs and was a professor of art history at Barnard College, Columbia University, from 1937–70.

Biography
Julius S. Held was born on April 15, 1905 to Adolf and Nannette Held, who ran a clothing store in Mosbach, Germany. He attended university in Freiburg, Heidelberg, Berlin, and Vienna, and earned his doctorate from the University of Freiburg in 1930 with a dissertation on Albrecht Dürer. After the Nazi regime came to power in 1933, Held sought a way to emigrate. He arrived in the United States in 1934. In 1936, he married Ingrid-Marta Nordin-Petterson, an art conservator. The couple had two children.

Held became professor of art history at Columbia University's Barnard College in New York City in 1937, a position he held until his retirement in 1970. Later in his life, he moved to Bennington, Vermont,  where he died in 2002.

Works
Held wrote several monographs on Dutch painters including Rembrandt, Anthony van Dyck, and Peter Paul Rubens. These works can be found by searching for Julius S. Held on Worldcat.

See also 
 Julius S. Held Collection of Rare Books

External links
 Julius S. Held Papers at the Getty Research Institute, Los Angeles, CA.
 Guide to the Julius S. Held Family Collection at the Leo Baeck Institute, New York, NY
 Interview of Julius Held at the UCLA Library’s Center for Oral History Research
 Record for Julius S. Held in the Archives Directory for the History of Collecting in America at the Frick Collection

References

1905 births
2002 deaths
German art historians
Columbia University faculty
Barnard College faculty
People from Neckar-Odenwald-Kreis
German male non-fiction writers
Rembrandt scholars
Scholars of Dutch art
Scholars of Netherlandish art
German emigrants to the United States
Corresponding Fellows of the British Academy